The New 3 Stooges is an American animated television series that ran during the 1965–66 television season starring the Three Stooges. The show follows the trio's antics both in live-action and animated segments. The cast consisted of Moe Howard, Larry Fine and Joe DeRita (as Curly-Joe), with actor and close friend Emil Sitka co-starring, as well as Margaret Kerry. The stories took place in varied settings, including a California beach and sailing as buccaneers on the Spanish Main.

Voice cast 
 Moe Howard
 Larry Fine
 Joe DeRita
 Emil Sitka
 Margaret Kerry
 Hal Smith
 Jeff Maurer
 Peggy Brown
 Tiny Brauer
 Paul Frees

Production
Forty-one live action sequences were executively produced by cartoonist Norman Maurer, Moe's son-in-law, who was their film agent at this time. Edward Bernds, who had directed the team at Columbia Pictures from 1945 to 1952 during most of the Shemp era, was also hired to write and direct the series. Emil Sitka, who had appeared in many of the Stooges comedies over the years, was slated to appear in these wraparounds as a straight man to the Stooges.

Cambria Studios produced 156 short Stooge cartoons under the supervision of Lee Orgel. Four cartoons were produced to correspond thematically with 40 of the live-action Stooge opening and closing sequences, so that one live-action sequence could serve as a wraparound for four different cartoons. Joe DeRita later commented that this presented something of a problem for viewers:

Most of the cartoons ended up with the trio running into the horizon after accidentally causing havoc at their current jobs and for getting into trouble. The cartoons were unusual for Cambria in that they did not use Syncro-Vox, Cambria's patented technique which used filmed footage of the voice actors' mouths over top of still frames. The pilot cartoon, "That Little Old Bomb Maker", featured a unique live-action wrap around that was not reused on other cartoons.

Some of the cartoons featured a recurring character named Badman, a jerky supervillain with a Batman get-up who is actually a 5-year-old boy that is nice and kind. The boy can only transform to Badman if he ever hears or says the word "bad", and for Badman, vice versa for "good". In the episode "Badman of the Briny", the two finally find out that they are the same person in several scenes. Another recurring character was a western outlaw named Getoutoftownbysundown Brown.

To avoid any potential licensing problems, Cambria did not use any of the past Three Stooges theme songs, including "Three Blind Mice", or "Listen to the Mockingbird", even though both had lapsed into the public domain at the time (likewise, the on-screen title used a numeral "3" to avoid infringing on any trademark Columbia Pictures might have held on the name "The Three Stooges"). Several of the musical pieces used on the show were also used for the series Bozo's Big Top.

The New 3 Stooges was not the first attempt at an animated version of the team. During the late 1950s, Norman Maurer attempted to sell Stooge Time, a live action/rotoscope animation mix half-hour series to television. In 1960, Maurer and the Stooges filmed a pilot for a half-hour series The Three Stooges Scrapbook, which featured a five-minute Stooge cartoon. The Stooges would later return to animated form for Hanna-Barbera (for whom they recorded the audio-only Yogi Bear and the Three Stooges Meet the Mad, Mad, Mad Dr. No-No just as The New 3 Stooges was ending) in two episodes of The New Scooby-Doo Movies and in the series The Robonic Stooges (the latter being produced after the death of both Moe Howard and Larry Fine).

Lawsuit
The series proved to be a financial headache for the Stooges. In accordance with their contract, Cambria Studios' distributor was supposed to forward quarterly statements to the trio to keep them abreast of the show's profits. Norman Maurer recalled receiving only one or two statements over a five-year period, ultimately leading to a lawsuit. The judge presiding over the case knew little about the film or television industry and ruled in favor of Cambria. The Stooges appealed the decision in 1975, leading to a victory in their favor. However, it changed nothing in regard to the distributor's failure to provide the necessary profit statements to Normandy Productions, and by the time the case was decided, both Larry and Moe had died.

Episodes
List of live-action wraparounds and cartoons for The New 3 Stooges television series (1965-1966):

Live-action wraparounds
Soldiers
Lost
Campers
Bakers
Zookeepers
Flat Tire
Fan Belt
Fishermen
Dentist (remake of The Tooth Will Out (1951))
Janitors
Artists
Decorators (remake of A Bird in the Head (1946)/Jerks of All Trades (1949))
Golfers (remake of Three Little Beers (1935))
Hunters
Weighing In
Telegram
Sunken Treasure
Outdoor Breakfast
Setting Up Camp
Rare Bird
Caretakers
Seasick Joe
Magicians
Electricians (remake of They Stooge to Conga (1943))
Salesmen
Barbers
Prospectors
Sweepstakes Ticket
Buried Treasure
Sunbathers
Inheritance
Melodrama
Waiters
Athletes
Doctors
Shipmates
High Voltage (remake of Monkey Businessmen (1946))
Pilots
Turkey Stuffers
Piemakers
Sharpshooter

Cartoons
<div style="width:50%; float:left">
A001 That Little Old Bomb Maker
A002 Woodsman Bear That Tree
A003 Let's Shoot the Player Piano Player
A004 Dentist the Menace (remake of The Tooth Will Out (1951))
A005 Safari So Good
A006 Thimk or Thwim
A007 There Auto Be a Law
A008 That Old Shell Game
A009 Hold That Line
A010 Flycycle Built for Two
A011 Dizzy Doodlers
A012 The Classical Clinker
A013 Movie Scars 
A014 A Bull for Andamo
A015 The Tree Nuts
A016 Tin Horn Dude
A017 Thru Rain, Sleet and Snow
A018 Goldriggers of '49
A019 Ready, Jetset, Go
A020 Behind the 8 Ball Express
A021 Stop Dragon Around
A022 To Kill a Clockingbird
A023 Who's Lion
A024 Fowl Weather Friend
A025 Wash My Line
A026 'Little Cheese ChaserA027 The Big WindbagA028 Baby SittersA029 Clarence of Arabia
A030 Three Jacks & a Beanstalk
A031 That Was the Wreck That Was
A032 The Three Astronutz
A033 Peter Panic
A034 When You Wish Upon a Fish
A035 Little Past Noon
A036 Hair of the Bear
A037 Three Lumps in a Lamp
A038 Who's for Dessert?
A039 Watts My Lion
A040 Which Is WitchA041 Suture Self
A042 The Yolks on You
A043 Tally Moe with Larry and Joe
A044 The First in Lion
A045 The Transylvania Railroad
A046 What's Mew Pussycat?
A047 It's a Bad Bad Bad Bad WorldA048 Bridge on the River Cry
A049 Hot ShotsA050 Mel's Angels
A051 Bee My Honey
A052 That Dirty Bird
A053 Stone Age Stooges
A054 Smoke Gets in Your Skies
A055 Queen Quong
A056 Campsight Fright
A057 Goldibear and the Three Stooges
A058 The Lyin' Tamer
A059 The Pen Game
A060 It's a Small WorldA061 Late for Launch
A062 Forgot in Space
A063 The Noisy Silent Movie 
A064 Get Out of Town by Sundown Brown
A065 Table Tennis Tussle
A066 Phony ExpressA067 Best Test Pilots
A068 Litter Bear
A069 A Fishy Tale
A070 The Unhaunted House
A071 Aloha Ha Ha
A072 The Rise and Fall of the Roman Umpire
A073 Deadbeat Street
A074 Cotton Pickin' Chicken
A075 Larry and the Pirates
A076 Tree Is a Crowd
A077 Feud for ThoughtA078 Bat and Brawl
</div>
A079 Knight Without End
A080 Up a Tree
A081 Turnabout Is Bearplay
A082 Pow Wow Row
A083 Flat Heads
A084 No News Is Good News
A085 Bully for You, Curly-Joe
A086 Tee for Three
A087 Goofy Gondoliers
A088 Bearfoot Fishermen
A089 Washout Below
A090 The Three Marketeers
A091 Follo the White Lion
A092 One Good Burn Deserves Another
A093 Curly-Joe's Bear
A094 Land Ho, Ho, Ho
A095 Surfs You Right
A096 Seven Faces of Timbear
A097 Bearfoot Bandit
A098 Nuttin' But the Brave
A099 Three Good Knights
A100 Call of the While
A101 Snowbrawl
A102 Rob 'n' Good
A103 There's No Mule Like an Old Mule
A104 Squawk Valley 
A105 Mummies Boys
A106 The Plumber's Friend
A107 Rub-a-Dub-Tub
A108 Under the Bad-Bad Tree
A109 Hairbrained Barbers
A110 Waiter Minute
A111 Souperman
A112 Abominable Snowman
A113 Curly-Joe in Wonderland
A114 Stooges in the Woods
A115 Chimney Sweeps
A116 The Mad Mail Mission
A117 Out of Space
A118 Wizards of Odd
A119 Three for the Road
A120 Feudin' Fussin' and Hillbully 
A121 Don't Misbehave Indian Brave
A122 You Ain't Lion
A123 Muscle on Your Mind
A124 Badmen in the Briny
A125 Furry Fugitive
A126 How the West Was Once 
A127 Bowling Pinheads
A128 The Mountain Ear
A129 Norse West Passage
A130 Lastest Gun in the West 
A131 Toys Will Be Toys
A132 First Glass Service
A133 Strictly for the Birds
A134 Le' Stooginaires
A135 The Bear Who Came Out of the Cold
A136 The Bigger They Are, the Harder They Hit
A137 Little Red Riding Wolf
A138 Bell Hop Flops
A139 Dig That Gopher
A140 Gagster Dragster 
A141 Just Plane Crazy 
A142 From Bad to Verse
A143 Droll Weevil
A144 The Littlest Martian
A145 The Bear Showoff
A146 No Money, No Honey
A147 Get That Snack Shack Off the Track 
A148 Curly's Birthday-a-Go-Go
A149 The Men from UCLA
A150 Super Everybody
A151 Kangaroo Catchers
A152 No Smoking Aloud
A153 The Chicken Delivery Boys
A154 Sno Ball
A155 Rug-a-Bye Baby
A156 Dinopoodi

Home media
Several episodes are currently available on VHS and DVD (often in cheap "dollar packages" with the cartoons and live action sequences being in poor quality) as the majority of the series fell into the public domain.

Using the original 16mm acetates, Rhino Entertainment issued a restored version in 2002 of 28 live action segments, and 32 of the cartoons over two volumes. Each volume contains a Spanish audio option, and Volume one has a near 7 minute retrospective interview with Lee Orgel. During it, he mentions only 39 live action segments being produced which adds confusion to some claims of there being 40 or 41. Of the many DVD releases of the show, these Rhino Volumes have many reviews stating they are of the best quality available of the series. In 2004, EastWest DVD released a slim case volume of episodes. In 2007 and 2008, Mill Creek Entertainment released a number of episodes as part of their Ultimate 150 Cartoon Festival, their Giant 600 Cartoon Collection and their 200 Classic Cartoons – Collector's Edition Label formats. On October 15, 2013, Image Madacy Entertainment released The New 3 Stooges: Complete Cartoon Collection on DVD in Region 1 making it the first time for a complete set to be released. The five-disc set features all 156 cartoons and 39 live action sequences on four discs, with the bonus disc being an audio CD by the Stooges which combines tracks from two of their albums (one of them being their 1959, The Nonsense Songbook).

In 2022, Mill Creek Entertainment released all 156 cartoons on a DVD called The Big Box of Nyuks.

ReceptionThe New 3 Stooges was well received upon initial airings, despite the use of limited animation. However, the Stooges were visibly aging during this time (Moe was 68 and Larry was 63), so the team's patented slapstick routines were subdued in the live action segments. Orgel later stated that the Stooges' penchant for violence was kept to a minimum due to the concerns of parental groups. In addition, Larry's motor skills had become somewhat sluggish, resulting in occasional slurred dialogue. To compensate, most of the comedy being divided between Moe and Curly-Joe, with Larry only chiming in when necessary. In retrospect, this altered comedy dynamic was a throwback to the Stooges' prime years in the 1930s when Curly Howard dominated the team's films and Larry was relegated to an occasional line of dialogue.The New 3 Stooges lasted for a single season. Although animated portions of the show were last aired in syndication on WGN-TV in the Chicago area in the early 1980s and 1990s, repackaged, redubbed and distributed at the time by DIC Animation City and Jeffrey Scott Productions, it is occasionally seen on Me-TV. It also aired in Japan on TV Tokyo.The New 3 Stooges  became the only regularly scheduled television series in the Stooges' history. Unlike other film shorts that aired on television like Looney Tunes, Tom and Jerry and Popeye the Sailor, the Stooges' short films never had a regularly scheduled national television program to air in, neither on network nor syndicated; the film shorts, at roughly 20 minutes apiece, were of ideal size to be run as a stand-alone television series in and of themselves. When Columbia/Screen Gems licensed the film library to television beginning in 1958, local stations aired the shorts when they saw fit, either as late-night "filler" or marathon sessions.

See alsoThe Three Stooges ScrapbookThe Robonic StoogesThe New Scooby-Doo MoviesLaurel and HardyThe Abbott and Costello Cartoon ShowHoppity Hooper''

References

External links

Cultural depictions of The Three Stooges
1965 American television series debuts
1966 American television series endings
American children's animated comedy television series
1960s American animated television series
First-run syndicated television programs in the United States
Animation based on real people
American television series with live action and animation
Television series by Cambria Productions